Deception is an American prime time soap opera television series that aired on NBC. The series, created by Liz Heldens, premiered on Monday, January 7, 2013.

On May 8, 2013, NBC canceled the series after one season.

Plot
When Vivian Bowers, a famous socialite, is found dead in a motel room from what appears to be a drug overdose, her estranged best friend Detective Joanna Locasto is re-embraced by the wealthy Bowers family. In time, she begins to uncover the truth of what really happened to her friend and who was behind the death.

Characters

Main
 Joanna Locasto (played by Meagan Good): A detective from the San Francisco Police Department and old friend of the Bowers family. She is working undercover with FBI agent Moreno to investigate Vivian's death. Joanna is asked to stay undercover by Haverstock, who wants to get the evidence needed to put Robert away for Vivian's murder.
 Robert Bowers (played by Victor Garber): The founder and CEO of a pharmaceutical company and the father of Vivian, Edward, and Julian. Robert is revealed to have murdered Vivian, yet the motive behind this was not revealed.
 Sophia Bowers (played by Katherine LaNasa): Robert's second wife and former secretary. It is revealed that Robert only married Sophia because people believed that he got her pregnant when it was Vivian who was pregnant by Haverstock.
 Edward Bowers (played by Tate Donovan): Robert's older son by his first wife.
 Mia Bowers (played by Ella Rae Peck): Haverstock and Vivian's biological daughter who was raised as Robert and Sophia's daughter. Mia gives Haverstock bone marrow because she is the only one who can be his donor.
 Will Moreno (played by Laz Alonso): An FBI agent investigating Vivian Bowers' death and the Bowers family.
 Julian Bowers (played by Wes Brown): Robert's younger son by his first wife and Joanna's Boyfriend.
 Samantha Bowers (played by Marin Hinkle): Edward's estranged wife.

Recurring
 Vivian Bowers (played by Bree Williamson): A socialite who is the daughter of Robert and his first wife and an old friend of Joanna Locasto. She is Mia's biological mother, but was raised as her sister. Her friendship with Joanna was strained due to Vivian's drug addiction. Vivian was found dead in a motel room following a supposed drug overdose. It turned out that Vivian was murdered by Robert.
 Tom Vanderfield (played by Geoffrey Cantor): The Bowers' family attorney.
 Dwight Haverstock (played by John Larroquette): A senator with a dark past and Mia's biological father. Haverstock asks Joanna to stay undercover because he wants the evidence needed to put Robert away for murder. Haverstock has said that he was in love with Vivian.
 Beverly Padget (played by S. Epatha Merkerson): Joanna’s mother.
 Kyle Farrell (played by David A. Gregory): Mia's boyfriend. Haverstock blackmailed Kyle into getting close to Mia so that he could convince her to save his life. Kyle grew to care for Mia and told her the truth before she gave Haverstock her bone marrow.
 Nichole Frishette (played by Anna Wood): Former journalist who is later killed (appeared in six episodes).

Episodes

References

External links
 
 

2013 American television series debuts
2013 American television series endings
2010s American drama television series
2010s American mystery television series
American television soap operas
American primetime television soap operas
English-language television shows
Nonlinear narrative television series
NBC original programming
Television series by Universal Television
Television shows set in New York (state)
Television shows filmed in New York (state)